Runiz Rural District is a rural district (dehestan) in Runiz District, Estahban County, Fars Province, Iran. At the 2006 census, its population was 5,639, in 1,344 families.  The rural district has 12 villages.

References 

Rural Districts of Fars Province
Estahban County